The Maid is a 2009 Chilean comedy-drama film, directed by Sebastián Silva and co-written by Silva and Pedro Peirano. It has won numerous awards since its premiere at the 25th Annual Sundance Film Festival. The film has had much critical acclaim, particularly for Catalina Saavedra's award-winning performance as the lead character.

Plot synopsis
For over 23 years, Raquel (Saavedra) has worked as the maid for the Valdes family. She shows utmost loyalty and respect to her employers, Pilar (Celedón) and Edmundo (Goic). Raquel gets along well with their teenage son, Lucas (Agustín Silva), but often clashes with their headstrong daughter, Camila (García-Huidobro).

When Raquel begins to suffer from dizzy spells caused by her excessive use of chlorine for household cleaning, Pilar decides to hire additional maids to assist Raquel with her daily chores. However, Raquel fiercely guards her territory and resents the newcomers, engaging in a series of increasingly desperate attempts to drive them away. This includes the younger maid, Lucy (Loyola), as Raquel tries to maintain her position in the household.

Cast
 Catalina Saavedra as Raquel
 Claudia Celedón as Pilar
 Alejandro Goic as Edmundo
 Mariana Loyola as Lucy
 Agustín Silva as Lucas
 Andrea García-Huidobro as Camila
 Anita Reeves as Sonia
 Delfina Guzmán as The Grandmother
 Luis Dubó as Eric
 Gloria Canales as Lucy's mom
 Luis Wigdorsky as Lucy's dad

Reception

Critical reception
Critics have responded very positively to the film. On Rotten Tomatoes the film has a 93% approval rating, based on 75 reviews, with an average rating of 7.6/10. The website's critical consensus reads, "Catalina Saavedra's devastating performance would be reason enough to see The Maid but Sebastian Silva's empathetic direction and finely tuned script only add to the movie's pleasing heft." On Metacritic, the film has a weighted average score of 82 out of 100, based on 24 critics, indicating "universal acclaim".

Film critic David Parkinson called it "an exceptional study of the emotional investment that domestics make in the families they serve. Saavedra is mesmerizing as she shifts from subservient to scheming." Chicago Sun-Times film critic Roger Ebert described the film as a "unpredictable, naturalistic gem."

Accolades
According to the National Board of Review, The Maid was one of 2009's five best Best Foreign-Language Films; also, it was nominated for the 67th Annual Golden Globe Awards consideration honoring 2009 achievements for the same category, and "AyAyAyAy" (the film's main theme song) was one of the 63 songs from eligible feature-length motion pictures contending for nominations in the Original Song category for the 82nd Academy Awards.

Despite the film's great success, the film was not chosen as Chile's submission to the 82nd Academy Awards. Instead, Miguel Littín's Dawson Isla 10 was sent, but the film didn't make the short-list.

References

External links
 
 

Maids in films
2009 films
Chilean independent films
2000s Spanish-language films
Sundance Film Festival award winners
Chilean comedy-drama films
2009 comedy-drama films
2009 independent films